The Goldikova Stakes is a Grade II American Thoroughbred horse race for fillies and mares age three years old or older over the distance of one mile on the turf scheduled annually in November at Santa Anita Park, Arcadia, California.  The event currently carries a purse of $200,000.

History
The event was inaugurated on 13 October 1969 as the Las Palmas Handicap at the Oak Tree Racing Association meeting at Santa Anita Park over a distance of  miles on the dirt and was won easily by the 9/5 favourite Manta with a margin of five lengths. 
The Las Palmas Handicap was named for the California-bred racing mare, Las Palmas. Foaled in 1929, she won the first ever race at the modern Santa Anita Park on Tuesday, 25 December 1934.

The following year the event was increased to  miles and moved to the turf track with Manta winning the event for the second time.

When the grading of races began as a Thoroughbred Owners and Breeders Association project in 1973 the event was classified as Grade III. In 1983 the event was upgraded to Grade II. 

In 2012 the event was renamed to the Goldikova Stakes in honor of Goldikova, the champion Irish bred mare who won the Breeders' Cup Mile three times in succession - 2008, 2009 and 2010. That same year the event was shortened to the one mile distance.

The event has been scheduled at times during the Breeders' Cup. In 2017 and 2021 the event was moved to Del Mar.

Records
Time record: 
 1 mile: 1:33.33 –  Beautyandthebeast (GB) (2006)
 miles: 1:43.92 –  Kostroma (IRE)  (1991)

Margins: 
 6 lengths - Typecast (1971) 

Most wins:
 2 - Manta (1969, 1970)
 2 - Ack's Secret (1980, 1981)
 2 = Going Global (IRE) (2021, 2022)

Most wins by an owner:
 4 - Juddmonte Farms  (1992, 1996, 2002, 2014)

Most wins by a jockey:
 4 – Kent J. Desormeaux (1991, 1992, 1994, 2015)

Most wins by a trainer:
 5 – Charles E. Whittingham (1976, 1977, 1983, 1985, 1994)

Winners

Legend:

See also
List of American and Canadian Graded races

References

Horse races in California
Santa Anita Park
Graded stakes races in the United States
Grade 2 stakes races in the United States
Mile category horse races for fillies and mares
Turf races in the United States
Recurring sporting events established in 1969
1969 establishments in California